When Mother Went on Strike is a 1974 West German comedy film directed by Eberhard Schröder and starring Peter Hall, Gila von Weitershausen and Belinda Mayne.

It was based on the 1970 novel Oh My Darling Daughter by the British writer Eric Malpass.

Cast
Peter Hall as Dr. Harry Kemper
Gila von Weitershausen as Gloria Perkin
Belinda Mayne as Viola Kemper
Hartmut Becker as Gabriel Gillhoff
Gaby Dohm as Doris Bandel
Siegfried Schürenberg as Onkel Walter Habinger
Elisabeth Flickenschildt as Tante Clarissa Habinger
Johanna Matz as Clementine Kemper
Dominique Müller as Persephone 'Persi' Kemper
Reiner Iwersen as Jochen Reitmoor
Rolf Boysen as Verleger Hansen
Tilo von Berlepsch
Oliver Schündler as Nicky Kemper
Rudolf Schündler as Pastor Hans

References

Bibliography
Bock, Hans-Michael & Bergfelder, Tim. The Concise CineGraph. Encyclopedia of German Cinema. Berghahn Books, 2009.

External links

1974 films
1974 comedy films
German comedy films
West German films
Films directed by Eberhard Schröder
Terra Film films
Constantin Film films
Films based on British novels
1970s German films